The FIBA Under-17 Women's Oceania Championship is an international women's  basketball competition inaugurated in 2004. The current champions are Australia. 

As of 2017, the previously known FIBA Oceania Under-18 Championship for Women competition (which was a qualifier for the World Cup) is now an Under-17 competition for Oceania teams to qualify for the Asian Championship (from which they can then qualify for the World Cup).

Summaries

Oceania Under-18 Championship

Oceania Under-17 Championship

Medal table

Participation details

References

Women's basketball competitions in Oceania between national teams
Oceania